Shojaabad (also Romanized as Shojā‘ābād; also known as Sajādābād and Sijjādābād) is a village in Yalghuz Aghaj Rural District, Serishabad District, Qorveh County, Kurdistan Province, Iran. At the 2006 census, its population was 172, in 34 families. The village is populated by Kurds.

References 

Towns and villages in Qorveh County
Kurdish settlements in Kurdistan Province